Giovanni Carlo Bandi JUD (17 July 1709 – 23 March 1784) was an Italian cardinal who served as Bishop of Imola.

Bandi was born in Cesena.  He was son of the count Francesco Bandi and the countess Cornelia Zangheri. He was the uncle of Pope Pius VI on his mother's side.

He was educated at the University of Fermo where he received a doctorate in utroque iure, both canon and civil law on 9 December 1734.  He was ordained on the 18 September 1734.  He served as an Auditor of Cardinal Tommaso Ruffo. He served as vicar general of the Suburbicarian See of Ostia.

Episcopate
He was appointed as titular bishop of Botri and appointed suffragan of Ostia and Velletri on 18 December 1744. He was Consecrated on 28 December 1744 by Carlo Alberto Guidobono Cavalchini.  He was transferred to the See of Imola on 20 March 1752.

Cardinalate
He was created cardinal in pectore in the consistory of 29 May 1775. His nomination was published in the consistory of 11 September of that year, when he was named Cardinal-Priest of Santa Maria del Popolo. He served as bishop of Imola until his death at the age of 74 in 1784.

References

1709 births
1784 deaths
18th-century Italian cardinals
Bishops of Imola
Cardinal-nephews
Cardinals created by Pope Pius VI